The 2009 Keihin Suzuka 2 & 4 was the second round of the 2009 Super GT season. It took place at Suzuka Circuit on April 18, 2009.

Race 

Keihin Suzuka 2 and 4
Keihin